Stafford College is a large provider of further and higher education based in Stafford, England.

The college campus is on Earl Street in Stafford Town Centre. Qualifications taught include a wide range of A-levels, with additional choice offered through the Stafford Collegiate, which is a collaboration between Stafford College and other local education providers. The College also offers vocational subjects, often in industry-standard facilities. Music technology students learn in a suite of recording studios; beauty therapists gain skills in the Stafford Beauty Academy, which is a working salon open to the public. Workshops exist for students of Motor Vehicle, Trowel Occupations, Construction Plant, Plumbing and on-campus restaurants provide experience for students training in hospitality subjects.

Since 2016 Stafford College and Newcastle Under-Lyme College have merged into Newcastle and Stafford Colleges Group.

In 2004 the College built a new sports hall providing teaching facilities for students on sports-related subjects and recreational opportunities for other students. The following year it opened the Broad Eye building (named after the Broad Eye Windmill, located just across the road from the college), a dedicated centre with studio facilities for art and design subjects.

Stafford College offers higher education courses in partnership with Staffordshire University. Subjects offered at HND and Foundation Degree-level are increasing and current information can be obtained from the College prospectus or its website. At present, Foundation Degrees include subjects such as: Fine Art, Illustration, 3D Design, Graphics & Digital Design, Photography, Fashion, Computing, Sustainable Communities, Small Business & Salon Management, Early Childhood Studies, Education (Teaching Assistants), Leadership & Management and Social Science.

Former students
 Steve Edge, actor 
 Christopher Sadler, award-winning director

References

External links
 

Education in Stafford
Buildings and structures in Stafford
Further education colleges in Staffordshire